USC Baseball may refer to:

 South Carolina Gamecocks baseball, the collegiate baseball program of the University of South Carolina (often referred to as "SC" or "USC" in athletics)
 USC Trojans baseball, the collegiate baseball program of the University of Southern California